Shadows in the Sun may refer to:
 Shadows in the Sun (2005 film), a television film
 Shadows in the Sun (2009 film), a British independent film